The Luohou Temple is a Buddhist temple located in Taihuai Town of Wutai County, Xinzhou, Shanxi, China.

Name
Luohou Temple was named after Rāhula and Luo Hou Luo for short, the only son of Siddhartha Gautama (commonly known as Buddha), and his wife Princess Yasodharā.

History
The temple was first established in the Tang dynasty (618-907) and initially called Shanzhu Geyuan. 

The temple was rebuilt in 1492, during the Hongzhi period (1488-1505) of Ming dynasty (1368-1644). During the Wanli period (1572-1620), Concubine Li Yanfei donated property to restore the temple.

In 1705, in the 44th year of Kangxi period (1662-1722) of Qing dynasty (1644-1911), the temple converted to Tibetan Buddhism. In 1792, in the 57th year of Qianlong period (1736-1795), the temple was reconstruction. 

In 1983, the temple has been classified as a "National Key Buddhist Temple in Han Chinese Area". In 2013, Luohou Temple is listed among the 7th batch of "State Cultural Protection Relics Units" by the State Council of China.

Architecture
Luohou temple consists of more than 118 buildings. The complex includes the following halls:  paifang, Hall of Four Heavenly Kings, Mahavira Hall, Hall of Manjushri, Great Buddha Hall, Buddhist Texts Library, Dharma Hall, Dining Room, etc.

Chinese guardian lions
On both sides of the Hall of Four Heavenly Kings there are two Chinese guardian lions. They were carved in the Tang dynasty (618-907).

Hall of Four Heavenly Kings
Four Heavenly Kings' statues are enshrined in the hall. They are the eastern Dhṛtarāṣṭra, the southern Virūḍhaka, the western Virūpākṣa, and the northern Vaiśravaṇa.

Hall of Manjushri
The Hall of Manjushri is the 2nd entry hall in the temple. A recumbent statue of Manjusri enshrined in the hall. The Manjusri Bodhisattva lies on a lotus.

Great Buddha Hall
Behind the Hall of Manjushri is the Great Buddha Hall enshrining the statues of Sakyamuni, Amitabha and Bhaisajyaguru.

Gallery

References

Buddhist temples on Mount Wutai
Gelug monasteries and temples
Wutai County
Xinzhou
Major National Historical and Cultural Sites in Shanxi